Nolavia is a genus of huntsman spiders containing 8 species. It was first described by C. F. Kammerer in 2006.

Species
 it contains 8 species.
Nolavia antiguensis (Keyserling, 1880) – Caribbean
Nolavia antiguensis columbiensis (Schmidt, 1971) – Colombia. Introduced to Germany
Nolavia audax (Banks, 1909) – Costa Rica
Nolavia fuhrmanni (Strand, 1914) – US Virgin Is. (St. Thomas)
Nolavia helva (Keyserling, 1880) – Colombia
Nolavia rubriventris (Piza, 1939) – Brazil
Nolavia stylifera (F. O. Pickard-Cambridge, 1900) – Mexico, Brazil
Nolavia valenciae (Strand, 1916) – Venezuela

See also
 List of Sparassidae species

References

Monotypic Araneomorphae genera
Sparassidae